Vadheim is a village in the municipality of Høyanger in Vestland county, Norway. It is located on the north shore of the Sognefjorden, along the small Vadheimsfjorden branch. The European route E39 highway runs through the village.

History

Vadheim is the resting place for one of the most famous warships of World War I. During that conflict, Germany converted a number of merchant ships to armed surface raiders. These ships cruised the world's shipping lanes and captured/sank Allied shipping. One of the ships she sank was Mount Temple which carried dinosaur fossils destined for the British Museum in London, England. Möwe survived the war. During World War II, under the name Oldenburg, was used in support of the occupation of Norway by Nazi Germany. On 7 April 1945 Bristol Beaufighter aircraft from No. 114 Squadron RAF, No. 455 Squadron RAAF, and No. 489 Squadron RNZAF sank Oldenburg at her moorings following an intense strafing and rocket attack.

Shortly after the end of World War II, the pre-war criminal and wartime resistance fighter Johannes S. Andersen broke into the German barracks in Vadheim and killed two German prisoners-of-war. The incident caused a controversy in Norway after the war when Andersen was charged in court with killing them. It was decided in 1947 that his indictment would be withdrawn.

Near Vadheim is Ytredal Bridge, an 18th-century stone bridge. It is a popular tourist attraction.

Notable residents
Even Hovland (born 1989) — association footballer
Vegar Gjermundstad (born 1990) — association footballer
Karl Friedrich Kurz (1878–1962) — novelist

References

Villages in Vestland
Høyanger